Nancy Perriam (born Ann Letton) (1770 – 1867) was an English woman from Exmouth, Devon, who was one of the few women of her time to serve on a warship.

Perriam was allowed to sail on HMS Orion, one of the few women permitted to accompany their husbands. She and her husband, Edward Hopping, served Sir James Saumarez on several ships. They served on HMS Orion for five years, including during action in L'Orient (1795) and Cape St Vincent (1797). Her official role was to mend the captain's shirts, but she also served as a powder monkey and assisted the surgeons with his operations, including amputations, including during the Battle of the Nile.

Nancy gave birth to two daughters while on HMS Orion. Her husband drowned in 1802, and she married a pilot, John Perriam, who died in 1812. Until the age of 81, she sold fish on the streets of Exmouth.

A photo of her, aged 93, is displayed in the Exmouth archives. There is a memorial to her at the Powder Monkey pub, part of the Wetherspoons chain of pubs and named in her honour, in Exmouth, Devon.

References 

1770 births
1867 deaths
18th-century English women
19th-century English women
18th-century English people
19th-century English people
People from Exmouth
Women in 18th-century warfare
People of the French Revolutionary Wars
Women in European warfare